Susan King Borchardt (born Susan King on July 27, 1981) is an American professional women's basketball player.

She was born in Richfield, Minnesota and grew up in a family of collegiate basketball players. Her father, Gary King, played at the University of Nebraska at Kearney. Her brother, Stephen, played at Ohio University.

From 1994 to 2000, she attended the Academy of Holy Angels, a Catholic coeducational high school in Richfield, Minnesota, where she became the first and only 7th grader in school history to play on the varsity girls' basketball team.

From 2000 to 2005, she played the point guard position on the women's team at Stanford University.

During her freshman season, she injured the anterior cruciate ligament (ACL) in her right knee, and missed the final 21 games of the year. While recuperating, she met her future husband, Curtis Borchardt, then a sophomore on Stanford's men's basketball team, who had just suffered a stress fracture in his right foot and missed the final 14 games of his season. Eventually, they married in August 2003.

After graduating, Curtis joined the Utah Jazz of the National Basketball Association (NBA) while Susan spent her senior year at Stanford.

After graduating with a degree in psychology, she was selected by the Minnesota Lynx during the 2005 WNBA Draft. She saw limited time with the Lynx, playing in only three games during the regular season before being waived by the team.

Career statistics

College
Source

WNBA

Regular season

|-
| align="left" | 2005
| align="left" | Minnesota
| 3 || 0 || 5.7 || .000 || .000 || .750 || 0.3 || 0.3 || 0.0 || 0.3 || 0.0 || 1.0
|-
| align="left" | Career
| align="left" | 1 year, 1 team
| 3 || 0 || 5.7 || .000 || .000 || .750 || 0.3 || 0.3 || 0.0 || 0.3 || 0.0 || 1.0

References

External links 

 Stanford basketball profile
 WNBA Player Profile
 March 30, 2004 Deseret News article on her marriage with Curtis Borchardt
 March 16, 2005 USA Today article on the couple

American women's basketball players
Point guards
1981 births
Living people
Minnesota Lynx players
Stanford Cardinal women's basketball players
Basketball players from Minnesota
People from Richfield, Minnesota